Omoadiphas cannula is a species of snake in the family Dipsadidae.

It is found in the mountain range Sierra de Agalta of Olancho Department, Honduras.

References

Original publications
 Mccranie & Cruz-Díaz, 2010 : A third new species of snake of the genus Omoadiphas (Reptilia, Squamata, Colubridae, Dipsadinae) from Honduras. Zootaxa, .

Omoadiphas
Snakes of Central America
Endemic fauna of Honduras
Reptiles of Honduras
Reptiles described in 2010